Bihać is a city and the administrative centre of Una-Sana Canton of the Federation of Bosnia and Herzegovina, an entity of Bosnia and Herzegovina. It is situated on the banks of river Una in northwestern Bosnia and Herzegovina, in the Bosanska Krajina region. In 2013 its population was 56,261.

Settlements

Bajrići
Brekovica
Bugar
Ćukovi
Doljani
Donja Gata
Dubovsko
Gorjevac
Grabež
Grmuša
Hrgar
Izačić
Jezero
Kalati
Kulen Vakuf
Lohovo
Lohovska Brda
Mala Peća
Mali Skočaj
Međudražje
Muslići
Ostrovica
Papari
Praščijak
Pritoka
Račić
Rajinovci
Ripač
Spahići
Srbljani
Velika Gata
Veliki Skočaj
Veliki Stjenjani
Vikići
Vrsta
Zavalje i Zlopoljac

History
According to documents and historical sources, the first medieval urban settlements and towns around the Una river, began to appear in the middle of the 13th century. Just two years later, in 1262, Bela proclaimed Bihać a royal free city and placed it under the direct authority of the Hungarian throne, with all rights and privileges pertaining thereto, which ensured its ability to develop completely independent from the political powers of local lords.
The following mention in the charter of 1271 confirms that Bihać at that time enjoyed the status of a free city. At the head of the municipality was the town elder or major villae, who was often called a judge, and whose decision could only be changed by the king. Bihać also had a curia or magistrates, an assembly of local citizens who took the oath of office for this duty, and notaries who kept court and other civil records.

In 1530 Austria sent troops to defend seven key strongholds in Croatia, one of them was Bihać and another the nearby Ripač. The Ottomans occupied Bihać in 1592 after a  siege and from that time Bihać was the most important forts in Bosnia until the 19th century. Ottoman rule was briefly interrupted by Auguste Marmont, general-governor of Illyrian Provinces on 5 May 1810. He sought to prevent Ottomans from raiding French Croatia and finishing the Ottoman occupation of Cetin. After fulfilling these goals, he withdrew from Bihac. Ottoman rule in Bihac ended de facto after the Congress of Berlin.

During World War II, the town was occupied by Axis troops and was included into the Pavelić's Independent State of Croatia (NDH). The fascist Ustashe regime committed the Genocide of the Serbs and the Holocaust. From July to September 1941, some 15,000 Serbs were massacred along with some Jews and Roma victims at the Garavice, an extermination location near Bihać. The town was the capital of a short-lived territory, the Bihać Republic, for two months in late 1942 and early 1943, until it was recaptured by German forces. Bihać returned to Bosnian territory on March 28, 1945.

Bihać was besieged for three years from 1992 to 1995 during the Bosnian War.

Demographics

According to the 2013 census, the city of Bihać has a population of 56,261 inhabitants.

Ethnic groups
The ethnic composition of the municipality:

Religion
Majority religion in Bihać city is Islam followed by Catholic and then Orthodox.

Geography

Climate

Economy
The agricultural sector is significant, due to the large and fertile soil.

Notable people
Mehmed Alajbegović, politician and lawyer
Mersada Bećirspahić, basketball player
Christopher Corvinus (Christopher Hunyadi, 1499–1505), Prince of Hungary and the last male member of the Hungarian Royal House of Hunyadi
Zlatko Dedić, Slovenian footballer
Ferid Džanić, World War II Axis soldier (SS Handschar Division)
Nihad Hasanović, writer and translator
Alen Islamović, singer, lead vocalist of the bands Divlje Jagode and Bijelo Dugme
Azra Kolaković, singer
Zele Lipovača, musician, leading member of Divlje Jagode
Irfan Ljubijankić, facial surgeon, classical music composer, politician and diplomat of Bosnia and Herzegovina
Dejan Matić, singer
Saša Matić, pop singer
Džanan Musa, basketball player, European U16 champion
Milan Muškatirović, water polo goalkeeper and professor of organic chemistry
Saša Radulović, Serbian engineer, politician and former Minister of Economy
Branka Raunig, archaeologist and museum curator
Dr. Amra Šabić-El-Rayess, professor and author
Faruk Šehić, poet
Amir Smajić, folk singer
Borislav Stanković, Serbian basketball player, coach and secretary General of FIBA

Twin towns – sister cities

Bihać is twinned with:

 Bondeno, Italy
 Kikinda, Serbia
 Kuşadası, Turkey
 Nagykanizsa, Hungary
 Novo Mesto, Slovenia
 Reșița, Romania
 Villefranche-de-Rouergue, France

See also
Fethija mosque
Siege of Bihać
University of Bihać, opened in 1997
NK Jedinstvo Bihać, local soccer club
Željava Air Base
Bihać Republic
Una National Park
Bihać Oblast

Notes
Official results from the book: Ethnic composition of Bosnia-Herzegovina population, by municipalities and settlements, 1991. census, Zavod za statistiku Bosne i Hercegovine - Bilten no.234, Sarajevo 1991.

References

External links

Official city presentation
Preminger Brewery

 
Populated places in Bihać
Bosnia and Herzegovina–Croatia border crossings
Cities and towns in the Federation of Bosnia and Herzegovina